Jillian Rose Reed (born December 20, 1991) is an American actress. She is best known for playing the role of Tamara Kaplan in MTV's TV series Awkward.

Early life
Reed was born in Hollywood, Florida, and raised in Coral Springs, Florida. She has two brothers, an older brother Matt and her younger brother is fellow actor Robbie Tucker. She performed competitive dance when she was about 4 as well as competitive jazz, tap and ballet in Michigan when she was twelve.

Career
From 2008 to 2009, Reed played Simone on the dark comedy-drama series Weeds.

In 2011, Reed was cast as Tamara Kaplan on the MTV original series Awkward. The role earned her a Young Artist Award nominated for Best Performance in a TV Series - Leading Young Actress. In 2012, she starred in the TV film My Super Psycho Sweet 16: Part 3 as Sienna Brooks.

She played Megan in the 2014 film Confessions of a Womanizer with Andrew Lawrence and Gary Busey.

Reed also appeared in a 2014 episode of Jessie titled "Acting with the Frenemy" where she played Abbey. She also guest starred on two episodes of Jack Black's Yahoo series Ghost Ghirls.

Personal life
Reed is involved with the American Diabetes Association due to her brother Matt having type 1 diabetes. Reed said in an interview with USA Today that "a lot of people think diabetes isn't one of those things that can happen to you. With the success of Awkward, I did have a voice. I can say something and people will listen, I can use social media and not just to tweet pictures of my cat."

Filmography

Film

Television

Web

Awards and nominations

References

External links

 
 
Jilian Rose Reed Profile on MTV

1991 births
Living people
American child actresses
American film actresses
American television actresses
Actresses from Florida
People from Hollywood, Florida
21st-century American actresses